Live Trax may refer to:

Live Trax (Megadeth EP), 1997 EP by Megadeth
Live Trax (series), a series of live albums by Dave Matthews Band
Live Trax (Dave Matthews Band album), 2007